In United States politics, the radical right is a political preference that leans towards extreme conservatism, white supremacism, or other right-wing to far-right ideologies in a hierarchical structure paired with conspiratorial rhetoric alongside traditionalist and reactionary aspirations. The term was first used by social scientists in the 1950s regarding small groups such as the John Birch Society in the United States, and since then it has been applied to similar groups worldwide. The term "radical" was applied to the groups because they sought to make fundamental (hence "radical") changes within institutions and remove persons and institutions that threatened their values or economic interests from political life.

Terminology
Among academics and social scientists, there is disagreement over how right-wing political movement should be described, and no consensus over what the proper terminology should be exists, although the terminology which was developed in the 1950s, based on the use of the words "radical" or "extremist", is the most commonly used one. Other scholars simply prefer to call them "The Right" or "conservatives", which is what they call themselves. The terminology is used to describe a broad range of movements. The term "radical right" was coined by Seymour Martin Lipset and it was also included in a book titled The New American Right, which was published in 1955. The contributors to that book identified a conservative "responsible Right" as represented by the Republican administration of Dwight D. Eisenhower and a radical right that wished to change political and social life. Further to the right of the radical right, they identified themselves as the "ultraright", adherents of which advocated drastic change, but they only used violence against the state in extreme cases. In the decades since, the ultraright, while adopting the basic ideology of the 1950s radical right, has updated it to encompass what it sees as "threats" posed by the modern world. It has leveraged fear of those threats to draw new adherents, and to encourage support of a more militant approach to countering these perceived threats. A more recent book by Klaus Wahl, The Radical Right, contrasts the radical right of the 1950s, which obtained influence during the Reagan administration, to the radical right of today, which has increasingly turned to violent acts beginning with the Oklahoma City bombing in 1995.

Wahl's book documents this evolution: "Ideologies of [today's] radical right emphasize social and economic threats in the modern and postmodern world (e.g., globalization, immigration). The radical right also promises protection against such threats by an emphatic ethnic construction of 'we', the people, as a familiar, homogeneous in-group, anti-modern, or reactionary structures of family, society, an authoritarian state, nationalism, the discrimination, or exclusion of immigrants and other minorities ... While favoring traditional social and cultural structures (traditional family and gender roles, religion, etc.) the radical right uses modern technologies and it does not ascribe to a specific economic policy; some parties advocate a liberal, free-market policy, but other parties advocate a welfare state policy. Finally, the radical right can be scaled by using different degrees of militancy and aggressiveness from right-wing populism to racism, terrorism, and totalitarianism."

Ultraright groups, as The Radical Right definition states, are normally called "far-right" groups, but they may also be called "radical right" groups. According to Clive Webb, "Radical right is commonly, but not exclusively used to describe anticommunist organizations such as the Christian Crusade and the John Birch Society... [T]he term far right ... is the label most broadly used by scholars ... to describe militant white supremacists."

Theoretical perspectives

McCarthyism
The study of the radical right began in the 1950s as social scientists attempted to explain McCarthyism, which was seen as a lapse from the American political tradition. A framework for description was developed primarily in Richard Hofstadter's "The pseudo-conservative revolt" and Seymour Martin Lipset's "The sources of the radical right". These essays, along with others by Daniel Bell, Talcott Parsons, Peter Viereck and Herbert Hyman, were included in The New American Right (1955). In 1963, following the rise of the John Birch Society, the authors were asked to re-examine their earlier essays and the revised essays were published in the book The Radical Right. Lipset, along with Earl Raab, traced the history of the radical right in The politics of unreason (1970).

The central arguments of The Radical Right provoked criticism. Some on the Right thought that McCarthyism could be explained as a rational reaction to communism. Others thought McCarthyism should be explained as part of the Republican Party's political strategy. Critics on the Left denied that McCarthyism could be interpreted as a mass movement and rejected the comparison with 19th-century populism. Others saw status politics, dispossession and other explanations as too vague.

Paranoid-style politics
Two different approaches were taken by these social scientists. The American historian Richard Hofstadter wrote an analysis in his influential 1964 essay The Paranoid Style in American Politics. Hofstadter sought to identify the characteristics of the groups. Hofstadter defined politically paranoid individuals as feeling persecuted, fearing conspiracy, and acting over-aggressive yet socialized. Hofstadter and other scholars in the 1950s argued that the major left-wing movement of the 1890s, the Populists, showed what Hofstadter said was "paranoid delusions of conspiracy by the Money Power".

Historians have also applied the paranoid category to other political movements, such as the conservative Constitutional Union Party of 1860. Hofstadter's approach was later applied to the rise of new right-wing groups, including the Christian right and the Patriot movement.

Trumpism

The political success of Donald Trump has prompted American historian Rick Perlstein to argue that historians have underestimated the influence and power on the modern American political right of populist, nativist, authoritarian, and conspiracy-minded right-wing movements, such as the Black Legion, Charles Coughlin, the Christian Front, and "birther" speculation; and to overestimated the more libertarian influence of William F. Buckley's limited government, free trade, free market intellectual conservatism, and the neoconservative pro-immigration and optimistic outlook of Ronald Reagan.

Current size
Political scientist Gary Jacobson,  gives an estimate of  the "size of the extremist vote" as a fraction of   Republican Party voters (there being essentially no right-wing extremists in the Democratic party), based on sympathizers as well as active supporters of the "Proud Boys, Oath Keepers, QAnon etc.". He points to  survey data of  Republicans who answered "yes" to questions such as whether they had a "favorable opinion of the people who invaded the Capitol on Jan. 6", thought  it likely that  Donald Trump would "be reinstated as president before the end of 2021",  and whether it was "definitely true" that “top Democrats are involved in elite child sex-trafficking rings.” Based on the results, which were stable over 2020-2022,  he estimated that "20 to 25 percent of the Republican electorate can be considered extremists".

Social structure
Sociologists Lipset and Raab were focused on who joined these movements and how they evolved. They saw the development of radical right-wing groups as occurring in three stages. In the first stage certain groups came under strain because of a loss or threatened loss of power and/or status. In the second stage they theorize about what has led to this threat. In the third stage they identify people and groups whom they consider to be responsible.  A successful radical right-wing group would be able to combine the anxieties of both elites and masses. European immigration for example threatened the elites because immigrants brought socialism and radicalism, while for the masses the threat came from their Catholicism.  The main elements are low democratic restraint, having more of a stake in the past than the present and laissez-faire economics. The emphasis is on preserving social rather than economic status. The main population attracted are lower-educated, lower-income and lower-occupational strata. They were seen as having a lower commitment to democracy, instead having loyalty to groups, institutions and systems.

However, some scholars reject Lipset and Raab's analysis. James Aho, for example, says that the way individuals join right-wing groups is no different from how they join other types of groups. They are influenced by recruiters and join because they believe the goals promoted by the group are of value to them and find personal value in belonging to the group. Several scholars, including Sara Diamond and Chip Berlet, reject the theory that membership in the radical right is driven by emotionality and irrationality and see them as similar to other political movements. John George and Laird Wilcox see the psychological claims in Lipset and Raab's approach as "dehumanizing" of members of the radical right.  They claim that the same description of members of the radical right is also true of many people within the political mainstream.

Hofstader found a common thread in the radical right, from fear of the Illuminati in the late 18th century, to anti-Catholic and anti-Masonic movements in the 19th to McCarthyism and the John Birch Society in the 20th. They were conspiracist, Manichean, absolutist and paranoid. They saw history as a conspiracy by a demonic force that was on the verge of total control, requiring their urgent efforts to stop it. Therefore, they rejected pluralistic politics, with its compromise and consensus-building. Hofstadter thought that these characteristics were always present in a large minority of the population. Frequent waves of status displacement would continually bring it to the surface.

D. J. Mulloy however noted that the term "extremist" is often applied to groups outside the political mainstream and the term is dropped once these groups obtain respectability, using the Palestinian Liberation Organization as an example. The mainstream frequently ignores the commonality between itself and so-called extremist organizations. Also, the radical right appeals to views that are held by the mainstream: antielitism, individualism, and egalitarianism. Their views on religion, race, Americanism and guns are held by a significant proportion of other white Americans.

Conspiracism

Throughout modern history, conspiracism has been a major feature of the radical right and subject to numerous books and articles, the most famous of which is Richard Hofstadter's essay The Paranoid Style in American Politics (1964). Imaginary threats have variously been identified as originating from American Catholics, non-whites, women, homosexuals, secular humanists, Mormons, Jews, Muslims, Hindus, Buddhists, American communists, Freemasons, bankers, and the U. S. government. Alexander Zaitchik, writing for the Southern Poverty Law Center (SPLC), credited cable news hosts, including Glenn Beck, Lou Dobbs, the John Birch Society, and WorldNetDaily with popularizing conspiracy theories. In the Fall 2010 issue of the SPLC's Intelligence Report, he identified the following as the top 10 conspiracy theories of the radical right:
 Chemtrails
 Martial Law
 Federal Emergency Management Agency Concentration Camps
 Foreign troops on US soil
 Door-to-door gun confiscations
 9/11 as government plan
 Population control
 High Frequency Active Auroral Research Program (HAARP)
 Federal Reserve
 North American Union

Common to most of these theories is an overarching belief in the existence of New World Order intent on instituting a one-world, communist government. Climate change being viewed as a hoax is also sometimes associated with the radical right.

Since 2017, the QAnon conspiracy theory has been widely promulgated among fringe groups on the far-right.

During the COVID-19 pandemic, far-right leaders and influencers have promoted anti-vaccination rhetoric and conspiracy theories surrounding the pandemic.

Right-wing populism

From the 1990s onward, parties that have been described as radical right became established in the legislatures of various democracies including Canada, Australia, Norway, France, Israel, Russia, Romania, and Chile, and they also entered coalition governments in Switzerland, Finland, Austria, the Netherlands, and Italy. However, there is little consensus about the reasons for this. Some of these parties had historic roots, such as the National Alliance, formed as the Italian Social Movement in 1946, the French National Front, founded in 1972, and the Freedom Party of Austria, an existing party that moved sharply to the right after 1986. Typically new right-wing parties, such as the French Poujadists, the U.S. Reform Party and the Dutch Pim Fortuyn List enjoyed short-lived prominence. The main support for these parties comes from both the self-employed and skilled and unskilled labor, with support coming predominantly from males.

However, scholars are divided on whether these parties are radical right, since they differ from the groups described in earlier studies of the radical right. They are more often described as populist. Studies of the radical right in the United States and right-wing populism in Europe have tended to be conducted independently, with very few comparisons made. European analyses have tended to use comparisons with fascism, while studies of the American radical right have stressed American exceptionalism. The U.S. studies have paid attention to the consequences of slavery, the profusion of religious denominations and a history of immigration, and saw fascism as uniquely European.

Although the term "radical right" was American in origin, the term has been consciously adopted by some European social scientists. Conversely the term "right-wing extremism", which is European in origin, has been adopted by some American social scientists. Since the European right-wing groups in existence immediately following the war had roots in fascism they were normally called "neo-fascist". However, as new right-wing groups emerged with no connection to historical fascism, the use of the term "right-wing extremism" came to be more widely used.

Jeffrey Kaplan and Leonard Weinberg argued that the radical right in the U.S. and right-wing populism in Europe were the same phenomenon that existed throughout the Western world. They identified the core attributes as contained in extremism, behaviour and beliefs. As extremists, they see no moral ambiguity and demonize the enemy, sometimes connecting them to conspiracy theories such as the New World Order. Given this worldview, there is a tendency to use methods outside democratic norms, although this is not always the case. The main core belief is inequality, which often takes the form of opposition to immigration or racism. They do not see this new Right as having any connection with the historic Right, which had been concerned with protecting the status quo. They also see the cooperation of the American and European forms, and their mutual influence on each other, as evidence of their existence as a single phenomenon.

Daniel Bell argues that the ideology of the radical right is "its readiness to jettison constitutional processes and to suspend liberties, to condone Communist methods in the fighting of Communism". Historian Richard Hofstader agrees that communist-style methods are often emulated: "The John Birch Society emulates Communist cells and quasi-secret operation through 'front' groups, and preaches a ruthless prosecution of the ideological war along lines very similar to those it finds in the Communist enemy". He also quotes Barry Goldwater: "I would suggest that we analyze and copy the strategy of the enemy; theirs has worked and ours has not".

History

Conspiracy theories

The American patriots who spearheaded the American Revolution in the 1770s were motivated primarily by an ideology that historians call Republicanism. It stressed the dangers of aristocracy, as represented by the British government, corruption, and the need for every citizen to display civic virtue. When public affairs took a bad turn, Republicans were inclined to identify a conspiracy of evil forces as the cause.

Against this background of fear of conspiracies against American liberties the first Radical Right-style responses came in the 1790s. Some Federalists warned of an organized conspiracy involving Thomas Jefferson and his followers, and recent arrivals from Europe, alleging that they were agents of the French revolutionary agenda of violent radicalism, social equalitarianism and anti-Christian infidelity. The Federalists in 1798 acted by passing the Alien and Sedition Acts, designed to protect the country against both foreign and domestic radicals. Fear of immigration led to a riot in New York City in 1806 between nativists and Irishmen, which led to increased calls by Federalists to nativism.

Anti-Masonic Party

In America, public outrage against privilege and aristocracy in the United States was expressed in the Northeast by advocates of anti-Masonry, the belief that Freemasonry comprised powerful evil secret elites which rejected republican values and were blocking the movement toward egalitarianism and reform. The anti-Masons, with a strong evangelical base, organized into a political party, the Anti-Masonic Party that pledged to rid Masons from public office. It was most active in 1828–1836. The Freemason movement was badly damaged and never fully recovered; the Anti-Mason movement merged into the coalition that became the new Whig Party. The anti-Masonry movement was not "radical"; it fully participated in democracy, and was animated by the belief that the Masons were the ones subverting democracy in America.  While earlier accounts of the antimasons portrayed their supporters as mainly poor people, more recent scholarship has shown that they were largely middle-class.

Nativism

The arrival of large numbers of Irish Catholic immigrants in the 1830s and 1840s led to a reaction among Americans, who were alarmed by the levels of crime and welfare dependency among the new arrivals, and the use of violence to control the polls on election day. Nativists began to revere symbols of Americanism: the Puritans, the Minute Men, the Founding Fathers and people who they considered true Christians. The immigrants were seen as pawns in a conspiracy to undermine America. Nativists in New York formed the American Republican Party. It merged into the Know Nothings in the 1850s. The main support for the Know Nothings was urban and working class. The party split over slavery and the northern wing merged into the Republican Party in the late 1850s.

White paramilitary organizations in the Southern United States
Starting in the 1870s and continuing through the late 19th century, numerous white supremacist paramilitary groups operated in the South, with the goal of organizing against and intimidating supporters of the Republican Party. Examples of such groups included the Red Shirts and the White League.

American Protective Association
In the Midwestern United States in 1887, the American Protective Association (APA) was formed by Irish Protestants who wanted to fight against the power of the Catholic Church in politics. It was a secret organization whose members campaigned for Protestant candidates in local elections and it opposed the hiring of Catholics for government jobs. Claiming to have secret documents which it obtained from nuns and priests who had escaped from the Catholic Church, it accused the Pope of absolving Catholics from loyalty to the United States and it also accused the Pope of asking Catholics to kill heretics. It also claimed that the Catholic Church ordered Catholics to emigrate to major U.S. cities where they could assume control and it also claimed that the civil service was dominated by Catholics who remitted part of their pay to Rome. The movement was rejected by mainstream Republicans and it faded away in the mid-1890s.

An offshoot of the APA, the Protestant Protective Association (PPA) was set up in the Canadian province of Ontario in 1891. It drew support from Orangemen in the 1890s, before it went into decline. Its leaders opposed Catholic influence and supported the Imperial Federation. A PPA was also set up in Australia.

Lily-white movement

The lily-white movement was an all-white faction of the Republican Party in the Southern United States which opposed civil rights and African-American involvement in the party, and it was active in the late 19th and early 20th centuries.

Second Ku Klux Klan
The Second Ku Klux Klan, which was formed in 1915, combined anti-Catholicism, antisemitism, white supremacy, Protestant fundamentalism and moralism with right-wing extremism. Its main source of support came from the urban south, the midwest and the Pacific Coast. While the Klan initially drew most of its members and supporters from the upper middle class, its bigotry and its violence alienated these members and it came to be dominated by less educated and poorer members as a result. The Klan claimed that there was a secret Catholic army within the United States which was loyal to the Pope, it also claimed that one million Knights of Columbus were arming themselves, and it also claimed that Irish-American policemen would shoot Protestants as punishment for heresy. They also claimed that the Catholics were planning to take over Washington and put the Vatican in power, and they also claimed that all presidential assassinations had been carried out by Catholics. The prominent Klan leader, D. C. Stephenson claimed that international Jewish bankers were behind the First World War and he also claimed that they were plotting to destroy economic opportunities for Christians. Other Klansmen claimed that the Russian Revolution and Communism were both controlled by Jews. The Klan frequently reprinted parts of The Protocols of the Elders of Zion and New York City was condemned as an evil city which was controlled by Jews and Catholics. However, the objects of the Klan's fears tended to vary by locale and they included Catholics, Jews, African Americans, Wobblies, Orientals, labor unions and liquor. The Klan was also anti-elitist and it also attacked "the intellectuals", seeing itself as the egalitarian defender of the common man.

British subjects who became naturalized Americans were encouraged to join the "Riders of the Red Robe" and the Klan was successful in establishing branches in several Canadian provinces, but it disappeared after 1930.

Great Depression

During the Great Depression there was a large number of small nativist groups, whose ideologies and bases of support were similar to those of earlier nativist groups. However, movements such as Huey Long's Share Our Wealth and Father Coughlin's National Union for Social Justice emerged, which differed from other right-wing groups by attacking big business, calling for economic reform and rejecting nativism.  However, Coughlin's group later developed a racist ideology.

The Black Legion, which had a peak membership of 40,000 was formed by former Klansmen and operated in Indiana, Ohio and Michigan. Unlike the Klan, its members dressed in black and its organizational hierarchy was based on the organizational hierarchy of the military, not on the organizational hierarchy of fraternal organizations. Its members swore an oath to keep "the secrets of the order to support God, the United States Constitution, and the Black Legion in its holy war against Catholics, Jews, Communists, Negroes, and aliens". The organization went into decline after more than fifty members were convicted of various crimes in support of the organization. The typical member was from a small farm in the South, lacked a high school graduation diploma, was married with children and worked in unskilled labor.

Gerald B. Winrod, a fundamentalist Christian minister who founded the Defenders of the Christian Faith revived the Illuminati conspiracy theory that was originally introduced into the United States in 1798. He claimed that the French and Russian Revolutions were both directed by the Illuminati and he also claimed that the Protocols of the Elders of Zion was an accurate expose of a Jewish conspiracy. He believed that the Jews, the Catholics, the communists and the bankers were all working together and plotting to destroy American Protestantism. Although Winrod's appeal was mainly limited to rural, poor, uneducated fundamentalist Christians, his magazine The Defender reached a peak circulation of 100,000 in the late 1930s.

William Dudley Pelley's Silver Shirts movement was overtly modelled on European fascism and introduced a populist statist plan for economic organization. The United States would be reorganized as a corporation, with individuals paid according to their contributions, although African Americans, aboriginals and aliens would be treated as wards of the state and therefore hold a lower status. The organization blamed the Jews for the depression, communism, and the spread of immorality, but it openly accepted Catholics as members. Its membership was largely uneducated, poor and elderly, with a high proportion of neurotics, and it also had a large female membership. Its main base of support was in small communities in the Midwest and on the West Coast, and it had almost no presence in the Southern States.

Charles Coughlin (Father Coughlin) was a Catholic priest who had begun broadcasting on religious matters in 1926. However, when his program went national in 1930, he began to comment on political issues, promoting a strongly anti-Communist stance, while being highly critical of American capitalists. He urged the government to protect workers, denounced Prohibition and held the "international bankers" responsible for the depression. By 1932 he had millions of regular listeners. The following year he set up the "National Union for Social Justice". Although an early supporter of the U. S. president, Franklin Roosevelt, he broke with him in 1935 when Roosevelt proposed that the United States join the World Court. Coughlin then denounced the New Deal, which he claimed had accomplished little but instead had strengthened the position of the bankers.  His organization became increasingly supportive of European fascism.

In 1936 Coughlin began to endorse candidates for political office and supported the presidential campaign of William Lemke, who campaigned on the Union Party ticket. Lemke was also supported by Gerald L. K. Smith, head of the Share Our Wealth movement and Dr. Francis Townsend, head of the Townsend Old Age movement. At the time Coughlin claimed that his organization had 5 million members, while Smith claimed that his organization had 3 million members. In the election however Lemke received fewer than 900,000 votes.

Following this setback, Coughlin became more overtly fascist, attacking trade unionists and politicians for being pro-Communist, calling for a corporate state and setting up "Social Justice Councils", which excluded non-Christians from their membership. His magazine, Social Justice, named Benito Mussolini as man of the year in 1938 and defended Hitler's "persecution" of Jews, whom he linked with Communism. Major radio stations then refused to air his broadcasts and the Post Office banned Social Justice from the mails in 1942. Threatened by a sedition trial against Father Coughlin, the Catholic Church ordered him to cease his political activities and Coughlin retired from political life.

Huey Long, who had been elected governor of Louisiana in 1928 and was a U.S. senator from 1932 until his death in 1935, built a national organization, Share Our Wealth, which had a populist appeal. He combined both left and right-wing elements. As governor, he removed the poll tax and directed state spending to the improvement of schools and rural roads.  He attacked "the corporations and urbanites, the 'better elements' and the professional politicians."  At the time of his death, his organization had, according to its files, over 27,000 clubs with a total membership of almost 8 million. Long never introduced minimum wage or child labor laws, unemployment insurance or old age pensions, although other states did so at the time. He actively courted support from big business, and reduced taxes on corporations. He differed from other right-wingers by making no appeal to conspiracy theories, nativism, or morality. He worked closely with Catholics and Jews and never appealed to race issues. However, he chose Gerald L. K. Smith, who was associated with the fascist Silver Shirts to organize his Share our Wealth movement.  But the movement died out following Long's death.

McCarthyism

Although the United States emerged from the Second World War as the world's most powerful country economically and militarily, communism had also been strengthened. Communism had spread in Eastern Europe and southeast Asia, and there were numerous Communist insurgencies. At the same time, Communist espionage had been found in the U.S. Responding to the fears the new enemy presented, Joe McCarthy, a Republican U.S. senator from Wisconsin, claimed in 1950 that there were 205 Communist spies in the State Department. The main target of McCarthyism however was ideological nonconformism, and individuals were targeted for their beliefs.  Black lists were established in many industries restricting the employment of suspected nonconformists, and libraries were pressured to remove books and periodicals that were considered suspect. McCarthy investigated Voice of America and although no communists were found, 30 employees were fired as a result. The strongest support for McCarthyism came from some of the German and Irish Catholics, who had been isolationist in both world wars, had an anti-British bias, and opposed socialism on ostensibly religious grounds. Catholic support was far from uniform, and many Catholics were actively opposed to McCarthy and his methods. Much of the hostility was directed against the Eastern elites. Following the GOP landslide in 1952, McCarthy continued his investigations into the new Republican administration until the Republican party turned against him.

John Birch Society

The John Birch Society, which was created in 1958, combined economic liberalism with anti-communism. The founder, Robert Welch, Jr., believed that the greatest enemy of man was government, and the more extensive the government, the greater the enemy.  To him, government was inherently corrupt and a threat to peace. He advocated private institutions, local government and rigid individualism.

Welch wondered why U.S. President Dwight D. Eisenhower had helped destroy Joe McCarthy, made peace with the communists in Korea, refused to support anti-communist movements abroad and had extended the welfare state. His conclusion was that Eisenhower was either a communist or a dupe of the communists and that the United States government was already 60% to 80% under communist control. Welch saw the communist conspiracy as controlled by the Illuminati, which he thought had directed the French and Russian Revolutions and was behind the current civil rights movement. They were also responsible for welfare programs, central banking, progressive income taxation and the direct election of U.S. senators. Welch identified William Morgan, William Wirt and Joe McCarthy as people who had been killed for their attempts to expose the Illuminati. Morgan's murder presumably by Masons had led to the earlier Anti-Masonic movement, Wirt had denounced the New Deal and McCarthy had claimed to have discovered a Communist conspiracy.

American Independent Party
The 1968 presidential campaign of George Wallace created a new party called the American Independent Party (AIP) which in later years came under the control of Radical Right elements. In 1969, the party had split into two groups, the anti-communist American Party under the leadership of T. Coleman Andrews and another group under the AIP founder Bill Shearer. Both groups opposed federal intervention into schools, favored police suppression of domestic disorder and victory in the Vietnam War. The two groups united under the American Party banner in order to support the 1972 presidential campaign of George Wallace, but after he withdrew they nominated U.S. Representative John G. Schmitz.

In Louisiana, Ned Touchstone, a Wallace supporter, edited a conservative newsletter, The Councilor, through which means he attacked liberals in both major parties. The Councilor was the publication of the White Citizens' Council. In 1967, Touchstone ran unsuccessfully as a Democrat against Louisiana Education Superintendent Bill Dodd, who carried the support of party moderates, liberals, and African Americans.

Constitutional militia and patriot movements

Although small militias had existed throughout the latter half of the 20th century, the groups became more popular during the early 1990s, after a series of standoffs between armed citizens and federal government agents, such as the 1992 Ruby Ridge siege and 1993 Waco Siege. These groups expressed concern for what they perceived as government tyranny within the United States and generally held libertarian and constitutionalist political views, with a strong focus on the Second Amendment gun rights and tax protest. They also embraced many of the same conspiracy theories as predecessor groups on the radical right, particularly the New World Order theory. Currently active examples of such groups are the 3 Percenters and the Oath Keepers. A minority of militia groups, such as Posse Comitatus and the Aryan Nations, were white nationalists and saw militia and patriot movements as a form of white resistance against what they perceived to be a liberal and multiculturalist government. In the 21st century, militia and patriot organizations were notably involved in the 2014 Bundy standoff, the 2016 Occupation of the Malheur National Wildlife Refuge, and in the 2021 United States Capitol attack.

Paleoconservatism

Paul Gottfried first coined the term paleoconservatism in the 1980s. These conservatives stressed (post-Cold War) non-interventionist foreign policy, strict immigration law, anti-consumerism and traditional values and opposed the neoconservatives, who had more liberal views on these issues. The paleoconservatives used the surge in right-wing populism during the early 1990s to propel the presidential campaigns of Pat Buchanan in 1992, 1996 and 2000. They diminished in number after the September 11 attacks, where they found themselves at odds with the vast majority of American conservatives on how to respond to the threat of terrorism.

Counter-jihad

In the aftermath of the September 11 attacks in 2001, the Counter-jihad movement, supported by groups such as Stop Islamization of America and individuals such as Frank Gaffney and Pamela Geller, began to gain traction among the American right. They were widely dubbed "islamophobic" for their vocal condemnation of the Islamic religion and their belief that there was a significant threat posed by Muslims living in America. They believed the United States was under threat from "Islamic supremacism", accusing the Council on American-Islamic Relations and even prominent conservatives like Suhail A. Khan and Grover Norquist of supporting Islamist groups such as the Muslim Brotherhood.

Minuteman Project
Jim Gilchrist, a conservative Republican, founded the Minuteman Project in April 2005. The Minutemen, inspired by the earlier Patriot movement and the original revolutionary Minutemen, advocated greater restrictions on illegal immigration and engaged in volunteer activities in the Southwestern United States against those perceived to be illegal immigrants. The group drew much criticism from those who held more liberal views on the immigration issues, with President George W. Bush condemning them as "vigilantes". The Minuteman Project was similar to the earlier Ranch Rescue organization, which performed much the same role.

Alt-right

The alt-right emerged during the 2016 U.S. presidential election cycle in support of the Donald Trump presidential campaign. It draws influences from paleoconservatism, paleolibertarianism, White nationalism, the manosphere, the Dark Enlightenment, identitarianism, and the neoreactionary movement, and it differs from previous radical right-wing movements due to its heavy internet presence on sites such as 4chan.

Groypers

Groypers, sometimes called the Groyper Army, are a group of White nationalist and far-right activists, who are notable for their attempts to introduce far-right politics into mainstream conservatism in the United States. The group is led by far-right political commentator Nick Fuentes.

Notable organizations
 American Freedom Party (2009–present)
 Traditionalist Worker Party (2013–2018)
 Vanguard America (2015–2017???)
 Identity Evropa (2016–2020)
 Patriot Front  (2017–present)
 Groypers (2019–present)

See also

 American militia movement
 Americanism (ideology)
 American nationalism
 Antisemitism in Christianity
 Antisemitism in the United States
 Antisemitism in the United States in the 21st century
 Geography of antisemitism#United States
 History of antisemitism in the United States
 Christian fascism
 Christian fundamentalism
 Christian Identity
 Christian nationalism
 Christian Nationalist Crusade
 Christian Patriot movement
 Christian reconstructionism
 Christian right
 Christian terrorism
 Christian Zionism
 Clerical fascism
 Creationism
 Creativity (religion)
 Discrimination in the United States
 Domestic terrorism in the United States
 Dominion theology
 Far-right politics
 Far-right subcultures
 Fascism
 Fascism in North America
 Great Replacement conspiracy theory in the United States
 Identitarian movement
 Jewish fundamentalism
 Jewish religious terrorism
 Kahanism
 Kinism
 Manosphere
 Moral Majority
 Nazism
 Neo-Confederates
 Neo-Fascism
 Neo-Nazism
 Northwest Territorial Imperative
 Patriot movement
 Positive Christianity
 Racism against African Americans
 Racism in the United States
 Radical right (Europe)
 Redemption movement
 Religious antisemitism
 Religious nationalism
 Religious terrorism
 Religious Zionism
 Right-wing populism
 Right-wing terrorism
 Sovereign citizen movement
 Straight pride
 Terrorism in the United States
 Theonomy
 White ethnostate#United States
 White genocide conspiracy theory
 White nationalism
 White pride
 White supremacy
 Wingnut (politics)
 Wotansvolk

Notes

Works cited

 Akenson, Donald H. An Irish history of civilization, Volume 2.  McGill-Queen's University Press, 2005 
 Berlet, Chip. Lyons, Matthew Nemiroff. Right-wing populism in America: too close for comfort. New York, NY: Guilford Press, 2000 
 Conner, Claire (John Birch Society daughter).  Wrapped in the Flag: A Personal History of America's Radical Right.  Beacon Press, 2013 
 Courser, Zachary. "The Tea 'Party' as a Conservative Social Movement". In SYMPOSIUM: THE FUTURE OF SOCIAL CONSERVATISM, Published online, Springer Science Media, LLC 2011
 Davies, Peter. Lynch, Derek. The Routledge companion to fascism and the far right. London: Routledge, 2002. 
 Diamond, Sara. Roads to dominion: right-wing movements and political power in the United States. New York: Guilford Press, 1995 
 Hofstadter, Richard. The Paranoid Style in American Politics (2008 edition), reprints famous essays from 1963 to 1964
 Ignazi, Piero. "The extreme right: defining the object and assessing the causes" inn Martin Schain, Aristide R. Zolberg, Patrick Hossay (Eds.), Shadows over Europe: the development and impact of the extreme right in Western Europe. New York: Palgrave Macmillan, 2002. 
 Kaplan, Jeffrey and Weinberg, Leonard. The emergence of a Euro-American radical right.  NJ: Rutgers University Press, 1998 
 Lipset, Seymour Martin. "The sources of the "Radical Right". In Daniel Bell (Ed.), The radical right, Volume 2000. New Brunswick, NJ: Transaction Publishers, 2002 
 Lipset, Seymour Martin. Raab, Earl. The politics of unreason: right wing extremism in America, 1790–1970. New York: Harper & Row, 1970  ISBN
 Mulloy, D. J. American extremism: history, politics and the militia movement. London:  Routledge, 2004 
 Norris, Pippa, "The Right in Elections" Paper in APSA Panel 36–15 at the Annual Meeting of the American Political Science Association, 2004, Chicago.
 Plotke, David. "Introduction to the Transaction edition: the success and anger of the modern American Right". In Daniel Bell (Ed.), The radical right, Volume 2000. New Brunswick, NJ: Transaction Publishers, 2002 
 Webb, Clive. Rabble rousers: the American far right in the civil rights era. Athens, GA: University of Georgia Press, 2010 
 Winks, Robin W. The Blacks in Canada: a history. McGill-Queen's University Press, 1997 
 Zaitchick, "'Patriot' Paranoia: A Look at the Top Ten Conspiracy Theories", Intelligence Report, Fall 2010, Issue Number:  139
 Ziff, Bruce H. Unforeseen legacies: Reuben Wells Leonard and the Leonard Foundation Trust. Toronto: University of Toronto Press, 2000

Further reading

External links
 The Lyle and Florence Brothers papers  at the American Heritage Center

 
Paleoconservatism
Political movements in the United States

White supremacy in the United States